Pok Pok was a group of Thai restaurants based in Portland, Oregon, founded and led by chef Andy Ricker. Pok Pok won both local recognition and major industry awards, with The Oregonian describing the restaurant as "one of those quintessentially Portland institutions, a sort of rags-to-riches story of the street cart that became a restaurant that became a legend." The main restaurant was located on Southeast Division Street in Portland; with its success Ricker opened satellite locations elsewhere in Portland, and at various times in Brooklyn, Los Angeles, and Las Vegas. Its remaining locations closed in 2020, during the COVID-19 pandemic.

History
The first Pok Pok opened in 2005, specializing in street food and northern Thai cuisine that Ricker had eaten on his travels, especially through Chiang Mai. The restaurant grew in recognition, being named The Oregonian's 2007 Restaurant of the Year, and featured in a 2009 episode of Guy Fieri's Diners, Drive-Ins and Dives. In 2011, he was named the James Beard Foundation's 2011 "Best Chef: Northwest" for his work. At its closure in 2020, The Oregonian called Pok Pok "Portland’s defining restaurant for more than a decade." 

A Brooklyn location followed in 2012; the Michelin Guide awarded it a star in its 2015 and 2016 editions but rescinded it in the 2017 Guide. Ricker closed the restaurant on September 2, 2018, citing rising costs.

Pok Pok Phat Thai and Pok Pok LA opened in the Chinatown neighborhood of Los Angeles in December 2014 and November 2015 respectively, but Pok Pok Phat Thai closed in August 2016 and Pok Pok LA followed in March of the following year.

In 2018, a Pok Pok Wing opened in the Cosmopolitan of Las Vegas's Block 16 Urban Food Hall dining area. This closed in December 2020 following the expiration of its licensing agreement, the last of the Pok Pok restaurants.

COVID-19 pandemic
In March 2020, Pok Pok announced its indefinite closure of all locations due to the COVID-19 pandemic, which has had an impact on the restaurant industry due to social distancing mandates and guidelines. Initially, Pok Pok followed the example of many restaurants across the US in providing takeout and delivery services while dine-in remains prohibited. Following the coronavirus-caused death of New York chef, Floyd Cardoz, Pok Pok's Andy Ricker published a statement explaining Cardoz's death as the reason for the change in strategy. Ricker cited the tragedy as a “wake-up call to the restaurant industry” and himself.

In mid June, Ricker confirmed the permanent closure of Pok Pok NW, Whiskey Soda Lounge, and the northeast and southwest Pok Pok Wing locations, leaving just the main restaurant and possibly the southeast Pok Pok Wing location. Ricker announced closure of the original and remaining locations in October 2020. A remaining Pok Pok Wing in Las Vegas continued service through December.

See also

 COVID-19 pandemic in Portland, Oregon
 Impact of the COVID-19 pandemic on the restaurant industry in the United States
 James Beard Foundation Award: 2010s
 List of defunct restaurants of the United States
 List of restaurants in New York City
 List of Thai restaurants

References

External links
 

2005 establishments in Oregon
2014 establishments in California
2015 establishments in California
2016 disestablishments in California
2018 disestablishments in New York (state)
2020 disestablishments in Oregon
Asian restaurants in Los Angeles
Asian-American culture in New York City
Defunct Asian restaurants in Portland, Oregon
Defunct Asian restaurants in the United States
Defunct restaurants in Los Angeles
Defunct restaurants in New York City
Restaurants disestablished during the COVID-19 pandemic
Restaurants disestablished in 2020
Restaurants established in 2005
Restaurants in Brooklyn
Restaurants in Las Vegas, Nevada
Richmond, Portland, Oregon
Thai restaurants in Portland, Oregon
Thai restaurants in the United States
Thai-American culture in California
Thai-American culture in New York (state)